The Complete Albums Collection is a compilation box set album collection by English heavy metal band Judas Priest, released on 12 June 2012 by Legacy Recordings. The Complete Albums Collection contains 17 Judas Priest albums, (excluding the Tim "Ripper" Owens era).

Remastered tracks
Each individual album is packaged in a replica mini-LP sleeve reproducing that album's original cover art. The set also contains a 40-page booklet with photos, liner notes, and album credits. Rocka Rolla and Sad Wings of Destiny have been newly remastered by Vic Anesini, with the latter album featuring a corrected track order beginning with "Prelude" and ending with "Deceiver", as indicated on the packaging of the original release. Albums from Sin After Sin through Painkiller utilize the 2001 remasters and feature the same bonus tracks, while Angel of Retribution through A Touch of Evil: Live are identical to their original releases.

Reception
Dayal Patterson of Record Collector wrote "Each album is presented here in a sturdy slipcase adorned with the original LP artwork, and there’s certainly no questioning the quality of the music – indeed, the majority of the albums here are considered vital entries in the heavy metal canon, with even the few weaker releases bearing some winning numbers. That said, the “complete” part of the box set’s title is somewhat misleading: there’s no sign of Jugulator or Demolition, the two albums made during Halford’s absence from the group, not to mention the brevity of the booklet, which omits both lyrics and colour. Still, it will certainly look much nicer on your shelf than 17 jewel cases..." Mary Ouelette of Loudwire stated "All in all, it's a great way for any fan to celebrate the music and the notable career of Judas Priest." James Christopher Monger of AllMusic commented "...The Complete Albums Collection is a treasure trove of metal goodness from a giant of the genre."

Albums included
Rocka Rolla
Sad Wings of Destiny
Sin After Sin
Stained Class
Killing Machine
Unleashed in the East
British Steel
Point of Entry
Screaming for Vengeance
Defenders of the Faith
Turbo
Priest...Live!
Ram It Down
Painkiller
Angel of Retribution
Nostradamus
A Touch of Evil: Live

Personnel
Rob Halford
Glenn Tipton
K. K. Downing 
Ian Hill
Scott Travis
John Hinch
Alan Moore
Simon Phillips
Les Binks
Dave Holland

References

External links
Judas Priest Official Website

2012 compilation albums
Judas Priest compilation albums
Legacy Recordings compilation albums
Reissue albums